BBC Thames Valley FM was a BBC Local Radio station covering the English counties of Oxfordshire and Berkshire, broadcasting between 1996 and 2000.

History

BBC Thames Valley FM began on 9 April 1996 following the merger of BBC Radio Oxford and BBC Radio Berkshire.  At launch the new station broadcast its own output from 0500-0100 seven days a week, although this was later cut back with the introduction of regional programming in the evenings. The initial presenter line-up included Andrew Peach and Phil Kennedy, Bob Harris on Sunday afternoons and Martin Kelner on Friday nights.  There were separate news bulletins for the two counties.

In September 1998 a new jingle package composed by David Arnold was introduced and the 'FM' suffix was dropped from the station name. Shortly afterwards separate breakfast and drivetime programmes for Oxfordshire and Berkshire were introduced.

The merged station was not popular with listeners, and in August 1999, as part of the BBC South East Review, it was announced that BBC Radio Oxford and BBC Radio Berkshire would regain their own identities.  The two stations relaunched on 14 February 2000, although their programme schedules remained unchanged, most output continuing to be shared.  However, by 2004 the two stations' schedules had become fully separated.

References

Defunct BBC Local Radio stations
Radio stations established in 1996
Radio stations disestablished in 2000
1996 establishments in England
2000 disestablishments in England
Radio stations in Berkshire
Radio stations in Oxfordshire